Natural disasters in Nigeria, is mainly related to the climate of  Nigeria, which has been reported to cause loss of lives and properties.  A natural disaster might be caused by flooding, landslides, insect infestation, etc. In order to be classified as a disaster, it will need to have a profound environmental effect and/or human loss, and must frequently incur financial loss. This occurrence has become an issue of concern, threatening large populations living in diverse environments in recent years.

Nigeria has encountered  several forms of disaster, which range from flooding, soil and coastal erosion, landslides, tidal waves, coastal erosion, sand-storms, oil spillage, locust/insect infestations, and other man-made disasters. It can be said that the country's under protected and expansive environment contributed to making the people especially vulnerable to these disasters. Other dangers include northern dust storms, which is usually from northern states to southern; causing damages through large deposits of dust and dirt from these regions. Hail is another cause, which rarely occurs in parts of Nigeria, leading to damage of crops and properties.

Types

Drought 
The drought of 1972 and 1973 was attributed to the death of 13% of animals in the north-eastern Nigeria and an annual agricultural yield loss of more than 50%.

The rainfall trend between 1960 and 1990 in northeast Nigeria has steadily declined by about 8 mm/year.

Nigeria's most recent drought was between 1991 to 1995.

Rainfall in northeastern Nigeria between the period 1994 to 2004 shows that the total annual rainfall range from 500 to over 1000 mm.

Flood 
Recurrent flood in different parts of Nigeria had led to considerable socio-economic damage, injury and loss of life.

2022

2021 

In August, a flood happened in Adamawa state, affecting 79 communities in 16 local government areas. Reports says that 7 people lost their lives and about 74,713 others displaced became homeless; While 150 farmlands and about 66 houses were destroyed according to Adamawa state Emergency Management Agency (ADSEMA).

2020 

In 2020, 68 people died and 129,000 people were displaced due to the 2020 flood incidences. This is according to the NEMA Director-General, Muhammadu Muhammed.

2017 

The 2017 Benue State flooding took place in September 2017 in Central Nigeria. It displaced 100,000 people, and damaged around 2,000 homes.

2012

2010 

1000 residents of Lagos and Ogun states region of Nigeria were displaced due to flood associated with heavy rainfalls, which was further exacerbated by the release of water from the Oyan Dam into the Ogun River

About 250,000 Nigerians were affected by the flooding in 2016, while 92,000 were affected in 2017

2023

On the 3rd of march 2023, there was a heavy downpour and rainstorm in Oke-Ako in the Ikole Local Government Area of Ekiti State. The situation lasted for over two hours and destroyed about 105 houses. The heavy downpour of rain also destroyed some electricity infrastructure across the town, subjecting the residents to total blackout. 
 
The Ekiti State Governor, Mr. Biodun Oyebanji, through his deputy Mrs. Monisade Afuye  described the incidents as devastating and assured the victims that government would give all the necessary support to mitigate whatever effect this situation must have caused them.

Emergency management 
National Emergency Relief Agency (NERA)

The National Emergency Relief Agency (NERA) was created by Decree 48 of 1976 in response to a devastating flood incidence between 1972 and 1973. NERA was a post disaster management agency with sole focus on coordination and distribution of relief material to disaster victims.

National Emergency Management Agency (NEMA) 

National Disaster Management Framework of Nigeria(NDMF)

The National Disaster Management Framework of Nigeria (NDMF) framework was created in 2010 to serve as legal instruments to guide stakeholders' engagement with respect disaster management in Nigeria. It was created to foster effective and efficient disaster management among Federal, State and Local Governments, Civil Society Organizations and the private sector. NDMF has 7 focus areas and a sufficiency criteria, namely:

 Institutional Capacity
 Coordination
 Disaster Risk Assessment
 Disaster Risk Reduction
 Disaster Prevention, Preparedness and Mitigation
 Disaster Response
 Disaster Recovery
 Facilitators and Enablers

See also 
 2012 Sahel drought
 Climate Change in Nigeria
 Environmental issues in the Niger Delta

References 

Disasters in Nigeria
 
Man-made disasters in Nigeria
Climate change
Effects of climate change
Climate change and the environment
Climate change and society
Floods in Nigeria
Climate change in Africa